Sean O'Neill (born July 31, 1967) is an American table tennis player and coach.  He began playing table tennis in Virginia at the age of 8 with this father, Patrick, who was a nationally ranked junior player from Toledo, Ohio. O'Neill went on to win every US National Age Championship title, including the Under 11, 13, 15, 17 (5 times), 21, and Over 30 events. In addition to the age events, O'Neill won the US National Men's Singles (5 times), Men's Doubles (5 times), and Mixed Doubles (6 times) Championships.

From 1983 to 1995 O'Neill participated in 5 World Championships, 4 Pan Am Games (winning 2 Gold, 5 Silver, and 1 Bronze Medal), 3 World Cups - Singles, Doubles, and Team - and 2 Olympic Games, in 1988 and 1992.  O'Neill was the 1990 North American Men's Singles Champion. O'Neill was named USATT Male Athlete of the Year on five occasions and served on the United States Olympic Committee's Athletes' Advisory Council as a player representative for the sport of table tennis.

O'Neill dominated the table tennis event at the US Olympic Sports Festival (formerly National Sports Festival). Participating in each event from 1981 to 1995, O'Neill won an unmatched 18 Gold, 5 Silver, and 4 Bronze medals in the sport of table tennis.  O'Neill lit the torch along with Sharon Cain of Team Handball in the Opening Ceremonies in San Antonio in 1993. O'Neill played for the Angby Sport Club in Stockholm, Sweden during his early junior career in addition to training in China on numerous occasions.

Upon retiring from full-time play, O'Neill began a coaching career that has led to work with the top US Para Table Tennis Players.  The head coach for the 2004, 2008, and 2012 US Table Tennis Paralympic teams, he has also led the team at the 2002 World Championships (Team Leader), 2006 World Championships (Head Coach) and the Para Pan Am Games/Championships in 2003, 2005, and 2007.

O'Neill was named National Collegiate Coach of the Year in 2005 as the head coach for the University of Virginia team. O'Neill was named USA Table Tennis National Coach of the Year in 2005. O'Neill was presented with the 2007 James "Doc" Counsilman Science Award for his work with telecoaching. O'Neill was named USATT Developmental Coach of the Year in 2010. He coached the Portland State University team in 2010–2011.

O'Neill contributed to NBC's Olympic Coverage in Athens in 2004, and was the color commentator for table tennis in Beijing in 2008, London in 2012, Rio in 2016, and Tokyo in 2021. He has also covered the 2009 and 2010 World Championships for NBC Universal Sports plus the 2015 and 2016 US Nationals for One World Sports.

O'Neill was inducted in the George C. Marshall Hall of Fame in 1998 and the USATT Hall of Fame in 2007. He was Director of Communications from 2014 to 2017 and High Performance Director from 2019 to 2021 for USA Table Tennis.  Sean presently works for Paddle Palace as a club coach and Director of Marketing & Communications.

References

External links
 USATT
 Angby Sport Club
 George C. Marshall Hall of Fame
 USATT Hall of Fame Profile

1967 births
Living people
American male table tennis players
Olympic table tennis players of the United States
Table tennis players at the 1988 Summer Olympics
Table tennis players at the 1992 Summer Olympics
Pan American Games gold medalists for the United States
Pan American Games silver medalists for the United States
Pan American Games bronze medalists for the United States
Pan American Games medalists in table tennis
Table tennis players at the 1983 Pan American Games
Table tennis players at the 1987 Pan American Games
Table tennis players at the 1991 Pan American Games
Table tennis players at the 1995 Pan American Games
Medalists at the 1983 Pan American Games
Medalists at the 1987 Pan American Games
Medalists at the 1991 Pan American Games
Medalists at the 1995 Pan American Games